Glen Mulready (born November 21, 1960) is an American politician who has served as the Oklahoma Insurance Commissioner since 2019. He was first elected in 2018.
He previously served in the Oklahoma House of Representatives from the 68th district from 2010 to 2018.

Career
Glen Mulready was first elected to the Oklahoma House of Representatives in 2010. In 2018, he retired to run for Insurance Commissioner.

Insurance Commissioner
2018

Mulready defeated Donald Chasteen, a Tulsa insurance agent and firefighter, for the Republican nomination for Insurance Commissioner in the June 2018 primary. He faced Democratic candidate Kimberly Fobbs in the general election. He would later go on to win the general election 2018.

2022

Mulready was re-elected as Oklahoma Insurance Commissioner in 2022 without opposition.

References

1960 births
Living people
Republican Party members of the Oklahoma House of Representatives
Oklahoma Insurance Commissioners